The third cabinet of Alexandru Vaida-Voevod was the government of Romania from 11 August 1932 to 19 October 1932.

Ministers
The ministers of the cabinet were as follows:

President of the Council of Ministers:
Alexandru Vaida-Voevod (11 August - 19 October 1932)
Minister of the Interior: 
Ion Mihalache (11 August - 19 October 1932)
Minister of Foreign Affairs: 
Alexandru Vaida-Voevod (11 August - 19 October 1932)
Minister of Finance:
Gheorghe Mironescu (11 August - 19 October 1932)
Minister of Justice:
Mihai Popovici (11 August - 19 October 1932)
Minister of Public Instruction, Religious Affairs, and the Arts:
Dimitrie Gusti (11 August - 19 October 1932)
Minister of National Defence:
Gen. Nicolae Samsonovici (11 August - 19 October 1932)
Minister of Agriculture and Property
Voicu Nițescu (11 August - 19 October 1932)
Minister of Industry and Commerce:
Virgil Madgearu (11 August - 19 October 1932)
Minister of Labour, Health, and Social Security:
D. R. Ioanițescu (11 August - 19 October 1932)
Minister of Public Works and Communications:
Eduart Mirto (11 August - 19 October 1932)

Ministers of State:
Emil Hațieganu (11 August - 19 October 1932)

References

Cabinets of Romania
Cabinets established in 1932
Cabinets disestablished in 1932
1932 establishments in Romania
1932 disestablishments in Romania